Itcha Mountain is one of the two named volcanic peaks of the Itcha Range, which is located in the Chilcotin District of the Central Interior of British Columbia, Canada. It is in the Anahim Volcanic Belt, which formed when the North American Plate moved over a hotspot, similar to the one feeding the Hawaiian Islands. The Anahim Volcanic Belt includes other immediately nearby ranges, the Rainbow and Ilgachuz Ranges. Both of these peaks are located within Itcha Ilgachuz Provincial Park, as is Far Mountain, the park's highest peak.

This mountain is the namesake for the Itcha Range, which is one of the several large shield volcanoes that stands all by itself.

See also
 List of volcanoes in Canada
 Volcanism of Canada
 Volcanism of Western Canada
 Itcha Range
 Ilgachuz Range
 Rainbow Range
 Anahim Volcanic Belt

References
 

Cinder cones of British Columbia
Two-thousanders of British Columbia
Hotspot volcanoes
Landforms of the Chilcotin
Polygenetic volcanoes
Itcha Range
Pleistocene volcanoes
Range 3 Coast Land District